Türlersee is a lake in the district of Affoltern, Canton of Zurich, Switzerland. It lies on the border of the municipalities of Aeugst and Hausen am Albis at an elevation of 643 m. The lake has an area of 0.49 km² (maximum length 1.4 km, width 500 m).

Gallery

See also
List of lakes of Switzerland

External links 

Legend about the formation of the lake 
  

Lakes of the canton of Zürich
Lakes of Switzerland
LTurlersee